Hanspeter Lüthi (born 27 April 1944) is a Swiss rower. He competed in the men's coxed four event at the 1972 Summer Olympics.

References

1944 births
Living people
Swiss male rowers
Olympic rowers of Switzerland
Rowers at the 1972 Summer Olympics
Place of birth missing (living people)